Antonella Bellutti (born 7 November 1968) is an Italian racing cyclist and two-time Olympic champion in track cycling.

She won the pursuit at the 1996 Summer Olympics in Atlanta and the points race at the 2000 Summer Olympics in Sydney.

Biography
Born in Bolzano, in South Tyrol, she now resides in Rovereto, in Trentino.

Bellutti won the silver medal in pursuit at the 1995 UCI Track Cycling World Championships in Bogota, Colombia. The following year she won a bronze medal in the same event.

From 1995 to 2000 she competed in UCI Track Cycling World Cup events, achieving top 3 placings in the  pursuit, points race and 500m time trial.

She also competed in road races.

She finished seventh at the Winter Olympics of Salt Lake City 2002 in two-women bobsleigh with the former Olympic and world gold medalist luger Gerda Weissensteiner.

Palmàres

1994
1st Pursuit, Italian National Track Championships

1995
1st Pursuit, National Championships
1st 500 m TT, National Championships
2nd Pursuit, Track World Championships
1995 Track World Cup
1st Pursuit, Round 6, Manchester

1996
1st Pursuit, 1996 Summer Olympics
1st Pursuit, National Championships
1st 500 m TT, National Championships
3rd Pursuit, Track World Championships
1996 Track World Cup
1st Pursuit, Round 1, Cali
1st 500m time trial, Round 1, Cali
1st Pursuit, Round 3, Athens

1997
1st Pursuit, National Championships
1st 500 m TT, National Championships
1st Sprint, National Championships
1997 Track World Cup
1st Pursuit, Round 6, Adelaide
1st Pursuit, Round 4, Cagliari
1st Pursuit, Round 3, Fiorenzuola d'Arda
1st Pursuit, Round 1, Cali
1st Points race, Round 1, Cali

1998
1st Pursuit, National Championships
1st 500 m TT, National Championships
1998 Track World Cup
1st Pursuit, Round 1, Cali
1st Points race, Round 1, Cali
1st Points race, Round 2, Victoria

1999
1st 500 m TT, National Championships
1st Points race, National Championships
1999 Track World Cup
1st Points race, Overall Series Winner

2000
1st Points race, 2000 Summer Olympics
1st Pursuit, National Championships
1st 500 m TT, National Championships
1st Points race, National Championships
1st Sprint, National Championships
2000 Track World Cup
1st Points race, Overall Series Winner
1st Pursuit, Overall Series Winner
1st Pursuit, Round 3 Mexico

See also
List of athletes who competed in both the Summer and Winter Olympic games
List of multi-sport athletes
Italian sportswomen multiple medalists at Olympics and World Championships

References

External links
 
 
 

1968 births
Living people
Sportspeople from Bolzano
Italian female bobsledders
Italian female cyclists
Italian female hurdlers
Italian track cyclists
Bobsledders at the 2002 Winter Olympics
Olympic gold medalists for Italy
Cyclists at the 1996 Summer Olympics
Cyclists at the 2000 Summer Olympics
Olympic bobsledders of Italy
Olympic cyclists of Italy
Olympic medalists in cycling
Medalists at the 1996 Summer Olympics
Medalists at the 2000 Summer Olympics
Cyclists from Trentino-Alto Adige/Südtirol
20th-century Italian women
21st-century Italian women